Greek hip hop, is the chief genre of rap music in Greece.

History
The earliest indications of the localized genre date back to 1987 the Maxi-single Deejays's  with the group FF.C, though native language albums did not appear until the mid-1990s. The first hip hop album was Diamartiria (protest) in 1993 of Active Member along with "Σκληροί καιροί" (Hard Times) by FF.C. Both albums released under the independent label "Freestyle Productions". Though many can argue that the album Modern Fears "Η Αναμέτρηση" (circa 1992) by Aris Thomas was the first hip hop influenced record in Greece. Then Razastarr followed with their unreleased demo on Freestyle Productions, and TXC (now Artemis/Efthimis) with their single Terror X Crew in 1995.

Gangsta rap came to Greece in 1997 with the group Zontanoi Nekroi (Ζωντανοί Νεκροί; Living Dead). In 1999 the group Paremvoles (Παρεμβολές) released the first hardcore CD named En Opsi (Εν όψει; In consideration of). In 2000 the group Alfa Gama (Άλφα Γάμα [Α.Γ.]) continued with the CD named Agnostofovia (Αγνωστοφοβία; Fear of the unknown). Imiskoumbria and Goin' Through made Greek hip-hop famous in the mainstream Greek audience. Goin' Through changed their way of music from hip hop to a kind of R&B or Pop music. The political issues and the society also invaded to this type of music. Terror X Crew introduced a new style of rapping with their CD's "I Polis Ealo" (1997) and "Essetai Imar" (2001). These ethnocentric albums signified the first time Greek nationalism was involved with hip-hop music. In 2001 Makis Voridis, the then president of the Hellenic Front, awarded the band for its service to contemporary Greek music.

Nowadays Greek hip hop covers a broad spectrum, all the way from hardcore hip hop to urban pop.

References